The Deserto de Viana is a sand desert in the northwestern part of the island of Boa Vista, Cape Verde. It is situated east of the towns Rabil and Sal Rei, and west of Bofarreira. The desert itself is not a protected area, but it is adjacent to the nature reserve Boa Esperança, which includes the Lagoa do Rabil and the Praia de Atalanta.

See also
 Geography of Cape Verde
 List of deserts

References

Geography of Cape Verde
Geography of Boa Vista, Cape Verde
Deserts of Africa